Microphis insularis, also known as the Andaman pipefish, is a species of freshwater pipefish belonging to the family Sygnathidae. This species is found only in rivers and streams located in the Andaman Islands, India.  They can reach  in length and reproduce through ovoviviparity, in which males carry eggs and give live birth. The Andaman pipefish is considered threatened likely due to the effects of habitat degradation, invasive species, and the alteration of flow of its freshwater habitats.

References

External links
Microphis insularis at Global Diversity Information Facility

Fish described in 1925
insularis